A Day in the Life is the second studio album by American R&B singer Eric Benét. It was released on April 27, 1999, on Warner Bros. Records. Benet's follow-up to his debut album, True to Myself (1996), it has sold 752,000 copies in the United States as of 2000.

Critical reception

AllMusic editor Michael Gallucci rated the album four out of five stars and wrote: "Benét scores with a series of mellow grooves and sizzling duets aimed at both the body and brain. A Day in the Life is sharper than contemporary R&B, keeping the arrangements and production simple, all the while nodding toward the genre's golden era of the '70s."

Track listing
Credits adapted from liner notes and Allmusic.

Notes
  denotes co-producer

Personnel
Credits adapted from liner notes and Discogs.

 Ali Shaheed Muhammad – drums
 Chalmers "Spanky" Alford – guitar
 Curtis "Sauce" Wilson – drum and keyboard programming
 Eric "Kenya" Baker – drum and keyboard programming
 Demonte Posey – keyboards, B–3 organ, drum programming, synth bass, fender rhodes
 Leslie Butler – keyboards
 Roy Ayers – vibraphone
 James Poyser – keyboards, fender rhodes
 Isaac Phillips – guitar
 Brian Frazier Moore – drums, drum programming
 Jef Lee Johnson – 12 string guitar

 Jazzy G – guitars
 Eric Benet – background vocals, lead vocals
 Jeff "Fuzzy" Young – background vocals
 Tamia – background vocals
 Shari Watson – background vocals
 Alison Ball–Gabriel – executive producer
 Me'Shell Ndegeocello – background vocals
 Brian Gardner – mastering
 Brad Hitz – photography
 Melanie Nissen – photography
 Stephen Walker – art direction and design

Charts

Weekly charts

Year-end charts

Certifications

Release history

References

1999 albums
Eric Benét albums
Warner Records albums
Pop albums by American artists